In video, skip field recording is a process in which only one field (one half of a frame) of video is recorded in order to conserve recording media space. For some kinds of recording, the quality loss of not using both fields of video is fairly negligible, it results in the loss of half of possible vertical video resolution and temporal resolution. It was a common method used in early telerecording systems, as well as early and current non-professional/industrial videotape formats such as CV-2000, Cartrivision and V-Cord.

See also 
 Low-definition television

Film and video technology